The 2012 Icelandic Cup, also known as the Borgunarbikar for sponsorship reasons, was the 53rd edition of the Icelandic national football cup. It began with the preliminary round on 1 May 2012 and was scheduled to end with the final on 18 August 2012 at Laugardalsvöllur. KR were the reigning champions, having won their twelfth Icelandic Cup the previous year.

Preliminary round 
The preliminary round consists of two teams from the lower Icelandic levels. The match were played on 1 May 2012.

|colspan="3" style="background-color:#97DEFF"|1 May 2012

|}

First round 
The first round consisted of the winner from the preview round, 35 teams from the lower Icelandic levels and 10 clubs from the 2. deild karla. The matches were played between 6 May and 8 May 2012.

|colspan="3" style="background-color:#97DEFF"|4 May 2012

|-
|colspan="3" style="background-color:#97DEFF"|5 May 2012

|-
|colspan="3" style="background-color:#97DEFF"|6 May 2012

|-
|colspan="3" style="background-color:#97DEFF"|8 May 2012

|-
|colspan="3" style="background-color:#97DEFF"|9 May 2012

|}

Second round 
The second round included the 23 winners from the previous round, 3 teams from the lower Icelandic leagues, 2 teams from the 2. deild karla and all 12 clubs from the 1. deild karla. The matches were played on 15, 16, 17 and 22 May 2012.

|colspan="3" style="background-color:#97DEFF"|15 May 2012

|-
|colspan="3" style="background-color:#97DEFF"|16 May 2012

|-
|colspan="3" style="background-color:#97DEFF"|17 May 2012

|-
|colspan="3" style="background-color:#97DEFF"|22 May 2012

|}

Third round 
The third round included the 20 winners from the previous round and the 12 clubs from the Úrvalsdeild. These matches were played on 6, 7, 8 and 12 June 2012.

|colspan="3" style="background-color:#97DEFF"|6 June 2012

|-
|colspan="3" style="background-color:#97DEFF"|7 June 2012

|-
|colspan="3" style="background-color:#97DEFF"|8 June 2012

|-
|colspan="3" style="background-color:#97DEFF"|12 June 2012

|}

Fourth round 
The fourth round consisted of the 16 winners of the previous round. These matches were played on 25 and 26 June 2012.

|-
|colspan="3" style="background-color:#97DEFF"|21 June 2012

|-
|colspan="3" style="background-color:#97DEFF"|25 June 2012

|-
|colspan="3" style="background-color:#97DEFF"|26 June 2012

|}

Quarterfinals 
This round consisted of the eight winners of the previous round. These matches were played on 8 and 9 July 2012.

|colspan="3" style="background-color:#97DEFF"|8 July 2012

|-
|colspan="3" style="background-color:#97DEFF"|9 July 2012

|}

Semifinals 
The semifinal matches involved the four winners from the quarter-final round and were played on 1 and 2 August 2012.

Final 
The final took place at Laugardalsvöllur on 18 August 2012 and was contested between the winners of the previous semi-final matches.

References

External links 
  

2012 in Icelandic football
2012 domestic association football cups
2012